Munadi (born 25 January 1989) is an Indonesian professional footballer who plays as a defensive midfielder for Liga 1 club Persikabo 1973.

Club career

TIRA-Persikabo
He was signed for TIRA-Persikabo to play in Liga 1 in the 2019 season. Munadi made his league debut on 26 July 2019 in a match against Kalteng Putra at the Pakansari Stadium, Cibinong.

Honours

Club honours
Persib Bandung U-18
Soeratin Cup: 2006

Persib Bandung U-21
Indonesia Super League U-21: 2009–10

Individual honours
 Indonesia Super League U-21 Best player: 2009-10

References

External links
 
 Munadi at Liga Indonesia

Indonesian footballers
1989 births
Living people
People from Bekasi
Sportspeople from West Java
Indonesian Premier League players
Liga 1 (Indonesia) players
Persib Bandung players
Pelita Bandung Raya players
Persibo Bojonegoro players
Persikabo Bogor players
Cilegon United players
Lampung Sakti players
Persikabo 1973 players
Indonesia youth international footballers
Association football midfielders